Lambert Bainomugisha (born 12 July 1961), is a Ugandan Roman Catholic prelate, who is currently the Archbishop of the Roman Catholic Archdiocese of Mbarara, in Uganda, since 25 April 2020. He was formally installed as archbishop of the archdiocese later on 20 June 2020.

Early life and priesthood
Bainomugisha was born on 12 July 1961, at Kashumba, in present-day Isingiro District in the Western Region of Uganda. He was ordained priest on 13 July 1991 at Mbarara. He served as priest in the Roman Catholic Archdiocese of Mbarara until 2 July 2005. On that day, he was appointed bishop.  Archbishop Bainomugisha holds a degree of Doctor of Philosophy in Canon Law, obtained from Saint Paul University, in Ottawa, Canada.

As bishop
He was appointed auxiliary bishop of the Roman Catholic Archdiocese of Mbarara, on 2 July 2005. He was consecrated as bishop on 1 October 2005 at Mbarara by Archbishop Paul Kamuza Bakyenga, Archbishop of Mbarara, assisted by Bishop John Baptist Kakubi†, Bishop Emeritus of Mbarara and Bishop Callistus Rubaramira, Bishop of Kabale.

He was appointed to Archbishop of the same archdiocese on 25 April 2020, when Pope Francis accepted the resignation of Paul Kamuza Bakyenga, who had reached the retirement age of 75 years, on 30 June 2019. He was installed as Archbishop on 20 June 2020, at Mbarara.

See also
 Uganda Martyrs
 Roman Catholicism in Uganda

References

External links

Right Reverend Lambert Bainomugisha, Archbishop of the Roman Catholic Archdiocese of Mbarara 

1961 births
Living people
21st-century Roman Catholic archbishops in Uganda
People from Isingiro District
Roman Catholic bishops of Mbarara
Roman Catholic archbishops of Mbarara